Anna Loerper (born 18 November 1984) is a German handball player for SG BBM Bietigheim and the German national team.

She represented Germany at the 2008 Summer Olympics in Beijing, where Germany placed 11th. She participated at the 2009 World Women's Handball Championship in China.

References

1984 births
Living people
German female handball players
Handball players at the 2008 Summer Olympics
Olympic handball players of Germany
German expatriate sportspeople in Denmark
Expatriate handball players
People from Viersen (district)
Sportspeople from Düsseldorf (region)